Short track speed skating at the 2019 Winter Universiade was held at the Arena Sever in Krasnoyarsk from 4 to 6 March.

Men's events

Women's events

Medal table

References

External links
Results
Results Book – Short Track Speed Skating

 
Short track speed skating
Winter Universiade
2019